"Jessica" is the second single from York-based rock band Elliot Minor. It was released on August 6, 2007. The band wrote this song out of their affection for Jessica Alba. The song was originally called "Walk With Me".

This was Elliot Minor's breakthrough single, and was one of the most popular singles during that period.

The music was written by Alex Davies, with lyrics by Davies, Ed Minton, and Dan Hetherton.

Music video
In the music video, the band plays in the crypt of a church, dressed in black clothing. The video starts and ends with a shot of Alex Davies' (lead vocals, guitar) eye opening and closing.

Track listings

Digital
 "Jessica" - 3:12
 "Jessica" (alternative/dance version) - 3:03
 "Jessica" (piano/acoustic version) - 2:59
 "Jessica" (Dark Angel version) - 2:55

CD

CD 1
 "Jessica" - 3:14
 "Forgetting You" - 3:13

CD 2
 "Jessica" - 3:14
 "Breaking" (demo)
 "Another Morning" (demo)

Vinyl

Side 1
 "Jessica" - 3:14

Side 2
 "Forgetting You" - 3:13

Charts

2007 singles
Elliot Minor songs
2007 songs